The  is an AC electric multiple unit (EMU) train type operated by East Japan Railway Company (JR East) on services in the Sendai area of Japan since February 2007.

Variants
  E721-0 series 2-car sets, since February 2007
  E721-500 series 2-car sets, since March 2007
  E721-1000 series 4-car sets, since November 2016
  SAT721 series 2-car sets, since March 2007 (owned by Sendai Airport Transit)
  AB900 series 2-car sets, since July 2019

Operations

Formations
, the fleet consists of 42 two-car E721-0 series sets (P-2 to P-44), four E721-500 series two-car sets (P-501 to P-504), and three SAT721 series two-car sets (SA101 to SA103), formed as follows with one motored (Mc) and one trailer (Tc') car.

E721-0 series

The KuMoHa cars have one PS109 single-arm pantograph. The KuHa cars have a toilet.

E721-500 series

The KuMoHa cars have one PS109 single-arm pantograph. The KuHa cars have a toilet.

E721-1000 series
The 19 four-car E721-1000 series sets (P4-1 to P4-19) are formed as follows, with two motored ("M") cars and two non-powered trailer ("T") cars. The KuHa E720 is located at the southern end.

The two motored cars (KuMoHa and MoHa) each have one PS109 single-arm pantograph. The KuHa cars have a toilet.

SAT721 series
The two-car SAT721 series sets are formed as follows.

The KuMoHa cars have one PS109 single-arm pantograph. The KuHa cars have a toilet.

AB900 series
The Abukuma Express AB900 series are derived from the E721-500 and SAT721 series used for JR East.

Sets are formed as follows.

History
The first E721-0 series sets were delivered from December 2006, and entered service on 1 February 2007 on Tohoku Main Line services. The first E721-500 and SAT721 series sets were delivered from February 2006 and entered service on Sendai Airport services on 18 March 2007.

Two sets, P-1 and P-19, were derailed and badly damaged by the 2011 Tōhoku earthquake and tsunami on 11 March 2011 while at Shinchi Station. Both sets were written off and scrapped.

The first of a fleet of 19 new four-car E721-1000 sets (76 vehicles in total) was introduced on 30 November 2016 on Tohoku Main Line, Joban Line, and Senzan Line services, replacing older 719 series units. The new trains are built by J-TREC, with construction shared between the company's Yokohama and Niitsu factories. These trains feature LED interior lighting.

The first four E721-1000 series intermediate cars were delivered from J-TREC's Niitsu factory to its Yokohama factory in September 2016 to be combined with driving cars built there.

In order to replace their 8100 series trains, Abukuma Express announced the order of new AB900 series trains in summer 2018. They are based on the E721 series, and are the first new trains for Abukuma Express since 1988. The first AB900 series set was delivered in February 2019. It entered service on 1 July 2019.

Fleet/build details
The manufacturers and delivery dates for the fleet are as shown below.

E721-0 series

E721-500 series 
The delivery of E721-500 series cars are as follows:

E721-1000 series
All manufactured by J-TREC.

SAT721 series
All sets are manufactured by Kawasaki and delivered as of 20 November 2006.

AB900 series
All sets are manufactured by J-TREC.

See also
 Aoimori 703 series, a derivative for use on the Aoimori Railway
 Railway electrification in Japan

References

External links

 JR East E721 series 

Electric multiple units of Japan
J-TREC multiple units
East Japan Railway Company
20 kV AC multiple units
Train-related introductions in 2006
Tokyu Car multiple units
Kawasaki multiple units